is a railway station located in the city of Ichinoseki, Iwate Prefecture, Japan, operated by the East Japan Railway Company (JR East).

History
Niitsuki Station opened on July 31, 1929. The station was absorbed into the JR East network upon the privatization of the Japan National Railways (JNR) on April 1, 1987.

Lines
The station is served by the Ōfunato Line, and is located 55.3 rail kilometers from the terminus of the line at Ichinoseki Station.

Station layout
Niitsuki Station has one ground-level side platform serving a single bi-directional track. The station is unattended.

Surrounding area
 ]
Iwate-Miyagi prefectural border

See also
 List of Railway Stations in Japan

External links

  

Railway stations in Iwate Prefecture
Ōfunato Line
Railway stations in Japan opened in 1929
Ichinoseki, Iwate
Stations of East Japan Railway Company